Carl Grünberg (10 February 1861 – 2 February 1940) was a German Marxist philosopher of law and history.

Biography

Born in Focșani, Romania, into a Jewish-Bessarabia German family, Grünberg studied law in Strasbourg and worked as an advocate. Later he studied political economy in Vienna. Among his academic teachers were Gustav Schmoller in Strasbourg and Lorenz von Stein and Anton Menger in Vienna. In 1894, he became academic reader for political law and economy at the University of Vienna. Grünberg was one of the founders of Austromarxism. Among his students were Otto Bauer, Rudolf Hilferding and Karl Renner. 1912 he got the chair for history of economy at the university of Vienna.

In 1924 he became the first director of the Institute for Social Research, later known as the Frankfurt School. He established and edited a journal of labour and socialist history, the Zeitschrift für Social- und Wirtschaftsgeschichte (1893) and the Archiv für die Geschichte des Sozialismus und der sozialen Bewegung (1911), a journal that is known today as the Grünberg-Archiv (Archive for the History of Socialism and the Workers' Movement). After having suffered from a stroke, he retired in 1929 and left the Institute to Max Horkheimer.

Works 
 Die Bauernbefreiung: Und die Auflösung des Gutsherrlich-Bäuerlichen Verhältnisses in Böhmen, Mähren und Schlesien (Leipzig 1893)
 Sozialismus, Kommunismus, Anarchismus (Jena 1897)
 Studien zur österreichischen Agrargeschichte (Leipzig 1901)

References

Further reading 

Günther Nenning: Biographie Carl Grünberg. In: Archiv für die Geschichte des Sozialismus und der sozialen Bewegung. Indexband. Graz 1973. p. 1–224.

1861 births
1940 deaths
People from Focșani
Romanian Jews
Moldavian Jews
Romanian emigrants to Austria-Hungary
Austrian people of Romanian-Jewish descent
Austrian emigrants to Germany
Romanian Marxists
Austrian Marxists
German Marxists
Jewish socialists
Romanian sociologists
Austrian sociologists
German sociologists
Jewish sociologists
Frankfurt School
Academic staff of the University of Vienna